Chbany is a municipality and village in Chomutov District in the Ústí nad Labem Region of the Czech Republic. It has about 600 inhabitants.

Administrative parts

Villages of Hořenice, Malé Krhovice, Poláky, Přeskaky, Roztyly, Soběsuky, Vadkovice and Vikletice are administrative parts of Chbany.

History
The first written mention of Chbany is from 1422.

References

Villages in Chomutov District